Siege of the Bastille is a gouache painting by Claude Cholat, now in the Carnavalet Museum in Paris, France.

Details
Claude Cholat was a wine merchant living in Paris on the rue Noyer at the start of the French Revolution in 1789. On the morning of 14 July a large Revolutionary crowd gathered outside the royal prison called the Bastille and in the afternoon fighting broke out between the crowd and the royal garrison. Cholat fought on the side of the Revolutionaries, manning one of their cannon during the battle. Afterwards, Cholat produced a famous amateur gouache painting showing the events of the day; produced in primitive, naive style, it combines all the events of the day into a single graphical representation.

Notes

Bibliography
Schama, Simon. (2004) Citizens: a Chronicle of the French Revolution London: Penguin. .

French paintings
1789 paintings
Paintings of the French Revolution
Paintings in the collection of the Musée Carnavalet